European, or Europeans, or Europeneans, may refer to:

In general 

 European, an adjective referring to something of, from, or related to Europe
 Ethnic groups in Europe
 Demographics of Europe
 European cuisine, the cuisines of Europe and other Western countries
 European, an adjective referring to something of, from, or related to the European Union
 European Union citizenship
 Demographics of the European Union

In publishing
The European (1953 magazine), a far-right cultural and political magazine published 1953–1959
The European (newspaper), a British weekly newspaper published 1990–1998
The European (2009 magazine), a German magazine first published in September 2009
The European Magazine, a magazine published in London 1782–1826
The New European, a British weekly pop-up newspaper first published in July 2016

Other uses
 
 Europeans (band), a British post-punk group, from Bristol

See also

  
 
 Europe (disambiguation)
 The Europeans (disambiguation)
 Transeuropean (disambiguation)
 Pan-European (disambiguation)
 
 
 
 European African
 "White people", a term for set of ethnic groups with varying definitions

European diaspora
Language and nationality disambiguation pages